Joëlle-Ann Blanchette is a Canadian television personality. She is the current host of CPAC's Détonations, a current affairs show covering Canadian politics from a youth perspective. Blanchette went on to become the communications advisor for the Jacques Cartier and Champlain Bridges Inc.

References

 Détonations website

Canadian television hosts
Canadian women television hosts
Living people
Year of birth missing (living people)
Place of birth missing (living people)